Fort Totten is a Washington Metro station in northeastern Washington, D.C. It acts as a transfer point between the Green, Yellow and Red Lines. It is the last station on the Green and Yellow lines in the District of Columbia before heading into Maryland. It is one of two stations (the other being Arlington Cemetery station) with three levels (the entrance and exit are on the second floor between the three lines), and is doubly unique in being the only multi-level transfer station built above ground and being the only such station to have island platforms on both levels, as opposed to just the lower level. The station's name comes from a Civil War-era fortification which itself was named after General Joseph Gilbert Totten, the Chief Engineer of the antebellum US Army.

The station is located in the middle of Fort Totten Park in Northeast, serving the neighborhoods of Fort Totten to the west and Queens Chapel to the east. The station also serves the adjacent neighborhoods of Riggs Park, North Michigan Park, and Michigan Park in Northeast D.C., the Manor Park neighborhood of Northwest, and the Maryland neighborhood of Chillum.

History

Service began on the Red Line (upper) platform on February 6, 1978, and on the Green Line (lower) platform on December 11, 1993.

The initial, southern section of the Green Line, between the Anacostia and U Street/Cardozo stations, opened roughly two years earlier in December, 1991. The northern portion, between the Greenbelt and Fort Totten stations, was completed on December 11, 1993. Between December 1993 and September 1999, the Green Line operated as two separate, unconnected segments because the line between Fort Totten and U Street/Cardozo had not been completed. The underground platform at Fort Totten served as the northern southern terminus until the mid-city Georgia Avenue-Petworth and Columbia Heights stations opened.
Passengers traveling between the two Green Line sections had to transfer to Red Line trains on the upper level at Fort Totten to continue their journey to Downtown Washington D.C. However, in order to eliminate this transfer, during weekday rush hour peak commuter times between January 1997 and September 1999, WMATA operated the Green Line Commuter Shortcut that bypassed Fort Totten station and used an underground connection to the Red Line, and served all stations up to Farragut North in Downtown. The Commuter Shortcut was discontinued in September 1999 when the northern and southern portions of the Green Line were connected and the Georgia Avenue-Petworth and Columbia Heights stations opened.

On December 31, 2006, as part of an 18-month trial, WMATA decided to extend the Yellow Line north of its original terminus at the Mount Vernon Square Metro Station, to the Fort Totten Metro Station, at all other times other than during weekday rush hour/peak period commuter times. Signage was replaced at all Green Line Stations in between the Fort Totten & Mount Vernon Square Metro Stations, to reflect this change between December 4, 2006 & January 1, 2007. On June 26, 2008, due to the success of the 18-month trial of the Yellow Line Extension to Fort Totten, WMATA decided to permanently extend the Yellow Line to operate all the way up to Fort Totten at all other times, except weekday rush hour/peak period commuter times. Eventually in June 2012, as part of the Metro Rush Plus program trial, the Yellow Line trains were extended further north of Fort Totten, to operate all the way up to Greenbelt during all other times, except for weekday rush hour/peak period commuter times.

Since May 25, 2019, the Yellow Line was permanently extended to operate to Greenbelt at all times, instead of terminating at Fort Totten during off-peak hours.

2009 Red Line collision

On June 22, 2009, two southbound Metro trains on the Red Line collided between the Takoma and Fort Totten stations, killing 9 and injuring 80, the deadliest accident in the system's history. A plaque in the station's mezzanine commemorates the victims of the crash. A plan to create a memorial outside the station has been proposed, as the current sign was felt to be insensitive by the victims' families.

Station layout

The lower-level platform for the Green and Yellow Lines is unique in that it is built into a hillside, part underground in a rock tunnel, and part at ground level in an open cut. A single-track connection east of the station allows trains to be moved between the Red and Green/Yellow Lines, and was once used for the Green Line Commuter Shortcut service to Farragut North via the Red Line tracks, before the mid-city segment of the Green Line was completed in September 1999.

There are two tracks to either side of the island platform, with Metro trains using the inner tracks and all freight, Amtrak and MARC Trains using the outer tracks, though neither one makes stops.

Access to the station is provided from Galloway Street NE, which connects to South Dakota Avenue NE to the east and Riggs Road NE to the north.

References

External links
 

 The Schumin Web Transit Center: Fort Totten Station (Upper Level)
 The Schumin Web Transit Center: Fort Totten Station (Lower Level)
 Galloway Street entrance from Google Maps Street View

Fort Totten (Washington, D.C.)
Stations on the Green Line (Washington Metro)
Stations on the Red Line (Washington Metro)
Washington Metro stations in Washington, D.C.
Stations on the Yellow Line (Washington Metro)
Railway stations in the United States opened in 1978
1978 establishments in Washington, D.C.
Railway stations located underground in Washington, D.C.